In miniature wargaming, players enact simulated battles using scale models called miniature models, which can be anywhere from 2 to 54 mm in height, to represent warriors, vehicles, artillery, buildings, and terrain. These models are colloquially referred to as miniatures or minis.

Miniature models are commonly made of metal, plastic, or paper. They are used to augment the visual aspects of a game and track position, facing, and line of sight of characters. Miniatures are typically painted and can be artfully sculpted, making them collectible in their own right. Pre-painted plastic figures, such as Clix miniatures produced by WizKids and unpainted plastic figures for Warhammer by Games Workshop, have become popular. The hobby of painting, collecting, and playing with miniatures originated with toy soldiers, though the latter were generally sold pre-painted.

Materials
Miniature models are derived from toy soldiers which were constructed of a variety of materials, These toy figures came to be mass produced from tin in late 1700s Germany, where they were called Zinnsoldaten (lit. "tin soldiers"). These early figures were flat models commonly called "flats", and became quite common in western Europe. By the mid 1800s manufactures in several countries were producing 3d miniatures of tin and lead alloys, common called white metal. In the 20th century miniatures would also be manufactured from  plastic and composite materials.     
   
In 1993, the New York legislature introduced a bill outlawing lead in miniatures, citing public health concerns. Many miniature manufacturers, anticipating that other states would also impose bans, began making figures with lead-free alloys, often at increased prices. After months of debate and protests by miniature manufacturers and enthusiasts, New York Governor Mario Cuomo signed a bill which exempted miniatures from the state's public health law. Despite this, most American manufacturers continued to use non-lead alloys.

Some wargames use "box miniatures", consisting of card stock folded into simple cuboids with representative art printed on the outside. Other games use 2d cardboard miniatures that are either held in a base or folded into a triangular tent.

Scales

Historically the size of miniatures was described in various different systems of measurement, most commonly in metric and English units. The most common miniatures were the 54 mm European miniatures and the 2 1/4" English models which are commonly considered to be 1:32 scale. Early wargames such as H.G Wells Little Wars used these commonly available miniatures. With metrication in the United Kingdom, United States manufacturers began to use the metric system to describe miniatures, as opposed to the previously popular customary units, so that their table-top wargaming models would be compatible. 

The scale of a figure is often described in millimeters, for example one of the most common scales is 28 mm. While a model may be described as 28 mm the actual height of the model may be different. This is because of a number of factors such as manufacturer, model proportion, method of measuring the model, the model's pose, and what sort of man the model is meant to represent.  A manufacturer might advertise its figures as 28 mm, but their products may be over 30 mm tall. Manufacturer's use of scale is not uniform and can deviate by as much as 30%. Some manufacturers measure figure height from the feet to the eyes rather than the top of the head; therefore, a figure that is 30mm to the top of its head could be considered a to be 28mm miniature. 

A further complication is differing interpretations of body proportions. Many gaming figures are unrealistically bulky for their height, with oversized feet, heads, hands, wrists, and weapons. Figurines with these exaggerated features are often referred to as "heroic scale". Some of these exaggerations began as concessions to the limitations of primitive mold-making and sculpting techniques, but they have evolved into stylistic conventions. 

Figures are commonly be used with a variety of scales. In 28 mm scale, short characters such as dwarves, hobbits, and goblins might be represented by figures in the 15 to 20 mm range while taller characters like ogres, trolls and dragons would use 30 mm or larger figures. It is not uncommon for there to be a mismatch between the game scale and miniature size. Chainmail used a scale of 1:360, appropriate to 5 mm miniatures, but was played with  30 mm miniatures, and the conceit that each figure represented 20 men. 
In many games there is a definite scale specified for the square grid that the game is played upon. One of the most common is 1 inch represents 5 feet. This specifies an exact scale of 1:60. That implies that a 28 mm tall figurine represents a  person – which is a reasonable number for a modern 50th percentile male (See: Human height). Another popular scale is 1/72 or 1 inch equals 6 foot which uses 20 mm, to 25 mm miniatures. It is mostly used for historical gaming in part due to a wide selection of 1/72 scale models.

Figures of 15 mm, 20 mm, 25 mm, 28 mm, 30 mm, 32 mm, and 35 mm are the most common for role-playing and table-top games. Smaller figures of 2 mm, 6 mm, 10 mm, 15 mm, and 20 mm are used for mass-combat wargames. Large sizes such as 40 mm and 54 mm were once popular with wargamers the in the past and are still used by painters and collectors. While the large miniatures have become popular again since the late 20th century, they are not as popular as the smaller sizes.

In the table below, figure height alone (excluding base thickness) is the feature from which approximate scale is calculated.

Scales smaller still are used when the game involves large vehicles (such as starships or battleships). For instance Axis & Allies Naval Miniatures: War at Sea uses 1:1800 scale, and scales down to 1:6000 are seen. There is no equivalent "mm" number for these scales as individual figures would be nearly microscopic and are not used as such in the games.

Miniature figure scale chart 
The following chart provides a numerical relationship between model scale and multiple figurine scales based on the platonic idea of the height of a human being (humanoid). The meaning of 15 mm (for example) is therefore dependent on a defined reference height. Thus 15 mm in the context of a dwarven world where the reference humanoid is 60 inches tall, is not equivalent to 15 mm in the context an NBA model where the reference humanoid is 2 meter s tall. Both models can be described as 15 mm, but the real world sizes depend on the size of the reference humanoid. In practice, the reference humanoid is generally assumed to be the idea of the average height of the human male, within a 6-inch interval between 5.5 feet and 6.0 feet, unless otherwise indicated by the designer.     Average human height is heavily dependent on the population measured within a geographical region and historical era.

Painting

Many role-playing gamers and wargamers paint their miniatures to differentiate characters or units on a gaming surface (terrain, battle mat, or unadorned table top).

Fantasy, role-playing, miniatures, and wargaming conventions sometimes feature miniature painting competitions, such as  Games Workshop's Golden Demon contest. There are also many painting competitions on the internet.

Manufacture
There are two basic methods of manufacturing figures: centrifugal/gravity casting and plastic injection casting.

Most metal and resin figures are made through spin casting. Larger resin models, like buildings and vehicles, are sometimes gravity cast, which is a slower process. To gravity cast, a sculptor develops a master figure, which is then used to create rubber master and production moulds. The production moulds are used to cast the final commercial figures.

Polyethylene and polystyrene figures are made by injection moulding. A machine heats plastic and injects it under high pressure into a steel mould. This is an expensive process; it is only cost effective when manufacturing large amounts of figures, since the quantity renders the cost per cast minimal.

Many miniatures companies do not produce their figures themselves but leave the manufacturing to specialized casting companies or miniatures companies that have casting facilities.

Sculpting
Most miniatures are hand sculpted using two-component epoxy putties in the same size as the final figure. The components of the putty are mixed together to create a sculpting compound that hardens over 48 hours. Some common brands include Polymerics Kneadatite blue\yellow (also known as "green stuff" and "Duro" in Europe), Milliput, A&B, Magic sculpt, and Kraftmark's ProCreate.

Until recently, sculptors avoided polymer clays as they cannot withstand the traditional mould-making process. Modern techniques using RTV silicone and softer-quality rubbers have made it possible to use weaker materials, so that polymer clay masters have become more common. Fimo clay is popular, though due to the individual properties of certain colours, only a limited selection of colours is used.

Masters for plastic miniatures are often made in a larger scale, often three times the required size. The master is measured with a probe linked to a pantograph that reduces the measurements to the correct size and drives the cutter that makes the moulds.

A more recent development is the use of digital 3D models made by computer artists. These digital models create a physical model for mould-making using rapid prototyping techniques. Alternatively, they can be used directly to drive a computer numerical control machine that cuts the steel mould. They can also simply skip moulding steps and directly produce miniatures from 3D models.

Miniatures in Dungeons & Dragons
Originally, Dungeons & Dragons was an evolution of the Chainmail medieval miniatures game, with the distinction that each player controlled a single figure and had a wider variety of actions available. The original D&D boxed set bore the subtitle, "Rules for Fantastic Miniature Wargames Campaigns Playable with Paper and Pencil and Miniature Figures". However, Dungeons & Dragons did not require miniatures, referring to them as "only aesthetically pleasing". Advanced Dungeons & Dragons likewise included a relatively short section describing miniature use, in conjunction with the official AD&D miniatures being produced at the time. As the game developed, miniatures became more of an optional add-on. The AD&D 2nd Edition accessory Player's Option: Combat & Tactics introduced a more elaborate grid-based combat system that emphasized the use of miniatures; a streamlined version of some of these concepts appeared in D&D 3rd edition. Although not strictly necessary, the 4th edition of the game assumes the use of miniatures, and many game mechanics refer explicitly to the combat grid. In addition to reducing ambiguity about the size and position of characters, this allows the game to specify rules for reach, threatened areas, and movement rates. The 5th edition de-emphasized these mechanics, and returned the use of miniatures to mostly optional.

Traditionally, figures were made of alloys, but pre-painted, collectible plastic miniatures have grown in popularity, including officially licensed D&D miniatures. In 2003, Wizards of the Coast produced the Dungeons & Dragons Miniatures Game as a standalone game that also served as the game's official line of miniatures; the game was discontinued as a standalone in 2011, but miniatures continued to be produced for use with the roleplaying game. Since 2014, WizKids has held the license to produce official D&D miniatures.

2D miniatures
Some games feature miniatures printed on cardboard or cardstock, and some companies have published such miniatures to be used in place of miniature models. 
Steve Jackson Games published the Cardboard Heroes line, and included cardstock miniatures in Steve Jackson's Man to Man, and then in the GURPS Basic Set and supplements such as GURPS Autoduel.
Zargonians was another early line of cardboard miniatures.
The Dungeons & Dragons Basic game included cardstock miniatures in supplements and adventures such as The Kidnapping of Princess Arelina, The Revenge of Rusak, The Veiled Society, and The Gem and the Staff.
Marvel Super Heroes by TSR included cardstock miniatures, and was supplemented by Adventure Fold-Up Figures and more in Pit of the Viper.
Other games that featured such 2D miniatures include Star Patrol, Ringworld, Dragonroar, Judge Dredd: The Role-Playing Game, TWERPS, and Space: 1889.

See also
 Miniature conversion
 Model figure
 List of gaming miniatures companies

References

Figurines
Miniature figures
Role-playing game terminology
Scale modeling
Types of sculpture